Zotalemimon bhutanum is a species of beetle in the family Cerambycidae. It was described by Stephan von Breuning in 1975. It is known from Bhutan.

References

bhutanum
Beetles described in 1975